Government Technical Institute (Yenangyaung) YGTI is a college under the Department of Technical, Vocational Education and Training, Ministry of Education. It is located in Yenangyaung, Magway Region, Myanmar. The area of the institute is 11.75 acres.

History

The Government Technical High School (Yenangyaung) was opened on 1 August 1977. It was promoted to Government Technical Institute on 1 December 1998.

Facilities

Drawing rooms and several classrooms are available to all students for private study. The library opens from 8:00 to 16:00 on weekdays. It holds a wide variety of technology-based books, magazines, journals and past papers. Internet and computer access are also available.

List of Principals

Faculty

Engineering Departments
Civil Engineering Department
Electronic and Communication Engineering Department
Electrical Power Engineering Department
Mechanical Engineering Department

Academic departments
Engineering Mathematics Department
Engineering Science Department
English Department
Myanmar Department

Administrative Units
Administration Department
Student's Affairs Department
Finance Department
Library Department

Programs

References 

Ministry of Science and Technology
အစိုးရ စက်မှုလက်မှုသိပံ္ပ(ရေနံချောင်း)

See also

List of universities in Myanmar

Technological universities in Myanmar